The Ministry of Economy is a government agency of Uzbekistan which oversees the socio-economic development and management, working with other departments in ministries in the country. The ministry has many functions, including the oversight and development of a stable macroeconomy, development of the market, development of economic scenarios, and keeping track of economic demographics.

References

Economy
Government of Uzbekistan
2002 establishments in Uzbekistan